Purcell is a British architectural design practice, founded in 1947 by Donovan Purcell. It has 11 regional studios in the UK and four studios in the Asia Pacific region.

History
In 1947, Donovan Purcell set up a small practice in Bury St Edmunds. Working on church and army buildings for many years, Purcell developed his expertise in conservation and in 1960 was appointed Surveyor to the Fabric of Ely Cathedral.

In 1965, Purcell partnered with architects Peter Miller and William “Bill” Tritton and the practice of Purcell, Miller and Tritton was established. Three years later, the partnership registered with offices in Bethel Street, Norwich and Sydney Street, London.

Over the years, the practice set up studios across the UK to provide strong regional coverage. The practice rebranded as Purcell in 2012 and expanded, opening studios in Cardiff, Manchester, Newcastle and Nottingham. Purcell acquired Worcester-based architect S T Walker and Duckham in 2015 and merged with Norfolk-based practice Reynolds Jury Architecture in 2016.

Internationally, the practice established its first studio in Hong Kong in 2009 and has developed its coverage in Asia Pacific with heritage consultancy teams in Melbourne and Sydney, Australia.

In May 2019, it became a limited company, transitioning to an employee ownership model in 2021.

As of 2022, Purcell has UK studios in Bristol, Cambridge, Canterbury, Cardiff, Colchester, Leeds, London, Manchester, Norwich, Oxford and York. The practice is the UK's 16th largest practice according to the AJ100 in 2021 and ranked 83rd in the World Architecture 100 in 2022.

Notable employees of Purcell have included Corinne Bennett.

Services 
The practice offers design services, masterplanning, heritage consultancy, conservation expertise, funding advice and planning advice. It has worked on many UK listed buildings.

Purcell works across eight sectors: cultural, education, hospitality, places of worship, public, residential, transport, and workplace and retail.

Projects 

Purcell has worked on notable public and private buildings in the UK and internationally including:
 Bristol Aerospace Centre, Filton Airfield
 Canterbury Cathedral
 Cardigan Castle
 CoRE (Centre of Refurbishment Excellence)
 Coworth Park Spa
 Durham Cathedral
 Flinders Street Station
 Florence Institute
 Hampton Court Palace
 Hong Kong Cricket Club
 The Hyde, Dillington House
 National Maritime Museum, Sammy Ofer Wing
 Oxford University Museum of Natural History
 Penarth Pier Pavilion
 Shackleton's Hut, Cape Royd
 The Wallace Collection, The Great Gallery
 Tai Kwun Centre for Heritage and Arts 
 Mandarin Oriental, Hyde Park
 National Portrait Gallery 
 Renovation of Clifton Cathedral, Bristol

Awards

References

External links

Architecture firms of England
1947 establishments in the United Kingdom
Welsh Eisteddfod Gold Medal winners
Recipients of Civic Trust Awards